Brigadier Demosthenes Amos Chilingutila served as the Chief of staff of the Armed Forces for the Liberation of Angola (FALA), the armed wing of UNITA, from 1979 to January 1985 and again after October 1986.

Jonas Savimbi, the leader of UNITA, demoted Chilingutila for UNITA's military failures in the 1970s to Chief of Operations in 1985. Alberto Joaquim Vinama succeeded Chilingutila until his death in a car accident in October 1986.  Chilingutila then regained his office.

References

Angolan rebels
Angolan warlords
Year of birth missing (living people)
Living people
Members of UNITA
People of the Angolan Civil War
20th-century Angolan people
21st-century Angolan people
Angolan revolutionaries